Accedian is a Canadian company that develops network communication and application monitoring software and hardware. Headquartered in Montreal, Canada, Accedian is majority owned by Bridge Growth Partners.

History 
Accedian was founded by Patrick Ostiguy and 4 partners in 2004. The company originally developed service assurance hardware and software for telecommunications service providers, including mobile network operators. The first product was a backhaul networks interface device, which links cell towers to central offices. Accedian has since made network function virtualization and virtualized customer-premises equipment (V-CPE) products.

In March 2017, Accedian announced a US$100M investment by Bridge Growth Partners in return for a major equity stake.

In February 2018, Accedian announced that it had acquired Performance Vision of Paris, France for an undisclosed amount. Performance Vision developed network performance management and application performance management solutions. In 2020, Dion Joannou was CEO of Accedian.

Awards and recognition 
In October 2011, Accedian was named on the Deloitte Fast 50 list of the fifty fastest growing technology companies in Canada.

In 2014, Accedian was named the fastest growing technology company in Canada with first place in the Deloitte Fast 50 list. Accedian placed second in Deloitte's Technology Fast 500 list for North America.

In February 2018, research firm Gartner named Accedian as a Magic Quadrant leader in the network performance monitoring and diagnostics (NPMD) category.

In 2021, Patrick Ostiguy was still executive chairman of Accedian Networks Inc.

References 

Companies based in Montreal
System administration
Network management
Companies established in 2004